(August 22, 1938 – May 23, 2017) was a Japanese politician. He was a member of the Liberal Democratic Party (LDP), the Sunrise Party of Japan and former member of the House of Representatives, serving his ninth term in the Lower House representing Tokyo's first electoral district until his defeat in the 2009 Japanese general election. He was Chief Cabinet Secretary to Prime Minister Shinzō Abe from August 2007 to September 2007, and Minister of Economic and Fiscal Policy in Tarō Asō's administration from February to September 2009.

Political career
Born the grandson of poets Yosano Akiko and Yosano Tekkan in Tokyo, Yosano graduated from the University of Tokyo in 1963. In 1972 he unsuccessfully ran for the House of Representatives, then served as secretary to Yasuhiro Nakasone. He ran again in 1976 and was elected. On August 27, 2007, he was appointed Chief Cabinet Secretary to Prime Minister Shinzo Abe, replacing Yasuhisa Shiozaki. He was replaced by Nobutaka Machimura on September 27 when Yasuo Fukuda succeeded Abe. He was appointed as Minister of Economic and Fiscal Policy and Minister of Regulatory Reform on August 1, 2008.

Following the resignation of Prime Minister Yasuo Fukuda, Yosano announced his candidacy for the LDP presidency on September 8, 2008:
 In the leadership election, held on September 22, 2008, Tarō Asō was elected with 351 of the 527 votes, while Yosano trailed in second place with 66 votes. In Aso's cabinet, appointed on 24 September 2008, Yosano retained his post as Minister of Economic and Fiscal Policy. On February 18, 2009, with the resignation of Shoichi Nakagawa on the case of the G7 conference, he took office as Minister of Finance and Minister in charge of financial services.

On April 4, 2010, Yosano, Takeo Hiranuma, Hiroyuki Sonoda, Takao Fujii and Yoshio Nakagawa announced their plans to leave the LDP to establish a new political party, the Sunrise Party of Japan. He left the Sunrise Party on 13 January 2011 to join the Naoto Kan's cabinet as Minister of Economic and Fiscal Policy.

Yosano was known for advocating an increase in the consumption tax to reconstruct the nation's debt-ridden fiscal structure. After joining the DPJ government, he drew up the plans for the 2012 consumption tax increase. The legislation was passed through the House of Representatives on June 26, 2012 and passed the Upper House on August 10, 2012.

Personal life and death
His hobbies included golf, making computers, photography, fishing, and playing Japanese board games. He was a Roman Catholic.

It was announced on September 5, 2012 that he would not run for re-election as he was suffering from throat cancer and had difficulty speaking. Yosano died on May 23, 2017.

References

External links 
 

1938 births
2017 deaths
Members of the House of Representatives (Japan)
Government ministers of Japan
Ministers of Finance of Japan
Education ministers of Japan
University of Tokyo alumni
Japanese Roman Catholics
Liberal Democratic Party (Japan) politicians
Sunrise Party politicians
21st-century Japanese politicians
Politicians from Tokyo